The European goldfinch or simply the goldfinch (Carduelis carduelis) is a small passerine bird in the finch family that is native to Europe, North Africa and western and central Asia. It has been introduced to other areas, including Australia, New Zealand and Uruguay.

The breeding male has a red face with black markings around the eyes, and a black-and-white head. The back and flanks are buff or chestnut brown. The black wings have a broad yellow bar. The tail is black and the rump is white. Males and females are very similar, but females have a slightly smaller red area on the face.

The goldfinch is often depicted in Italian Renaissance paintings of the Madonna and Child.

Taxonomy
The European goldfinch was one of the birds described and illustrated by Swiss naturalist Conrad Gessner in his Historiae animalium of 1555. The first formal description was by Carl Linnaeus in the 10th edition of his Systema Naturae published in 1758. He introduced the binomial name, Fringilla carduelis.  Carduelis is the Latin word for 'goldfinch'. The European goldfinch is now placed in the genus Carduelis that was introduced by the French zoologist Mathurin Jacques Brisson in 1760 by tautonomy based on Linnaeus's specific epithet. Modern molecular genetic studies have shown that the European goldfinch is closely related to the citril finch (Carduelis citrinella) and the Corsican finch (Carduelis corsicana).

The English word 'goldfinch' was used in the second half of the 14th century by Geoffrey Chaucer in his unfinished The Cook's Tale: "Gaillard he was as goldfynch in the shawe (Gaily dressed he was as is a goldfinch in the woods)".

Subspecies
The subspecies of the European goldfinch are divided into two major groups. These intergrade at their boundary, so the groups are not recognized as distinct species despite their readily distinguishable plumage. Subspecies in the carduelis (black-crowned) group occupy the western part of the range and have black crowns; subspecies in the caniceps (grey-headed) group occupy the eastern part of the range and have grey heads.

carduelis group
C. c. balcanica Sachtleben, 1919 – southeastern European
C. c. brevirostris Zarudny, 1890 – Crimea, the northern Caucasus
C. c. britannica (Hartert, 1903) – the British Isles
C. c. carduelis (Linnaeus, 1758) – most of the European mainland, Scandinavia
C. c. colchica  Koudashev, 1915 – Crimea and the northern Caucasus
C. c. frigoris Wolters, 1953 – western Siberia
C. c. niediecki Reichenow, 1907 – southwest Asia (Rhodes, Karpathos, Cyprus, Egypt to Asia Minor, North Iraq, Southwest Iran, Northeast Africa
C. c. parva Tschusi, 1901 – the Atlantic Macaronesic islands (the Canary Islands, Madeira), Iberia, northwest Africa
C. c. tschusii Arrigoni degli Oddi, 1902 – Corsica, Sardinia, Sicily
C. c. volgensis Buturlin, 1906 – southern Ukraine, southwestern Russia and northwestern Kazakhstan	
caniceps group
C. c. caniceps Vigors, 1831 – southern central Asia (W Himalayas - Kashmir to Nepal and West Tibet)
C. c. paropanisi Kollibay, 1910 – Afghanistan to the western Himalaya and Tien Shan Mountains
C. c. subulata (Gloger, 1833) – south-central Siberia to Lake Baikal and Northwest Mongolia
C. c. ultima Koelz, 1949 – southern Iran

Phylogeny 
The European goldfinch originated in the late Miocene-Pliocene and belongs to the clade of cardueline finches. The citril finch and the Corsican finch are its sister taxa. Their closest relatives are the greenfinches, crossbills and redpolls. The monophyly of the subfamily Carduelinae is suggested in previous studies.

Description 

The sexes are broadly similar, with a red face, black and white head, warm brown upper parts, white underparts with buff flanks and breast patches, and black and yellow wings.

On closer inspection, male European goldfinches can often be distinguished by a larger, darker red mask that extends just behind the eye. The shoulder feathers are black, whereas they are brown on the female. In females, the red face does not extend past the eye. The ivory-coloured bill is long and pointed, and the tail is forked. Goldfinches in breeding condition have a white bill, with a greyish or blackish mark at the tip for the rest of the year. Juveniles have a plain head and a greyer back but are unmistakable due to the yellow wing stripe. Birds in central Asia (the caniceps group) have a plain grey head behind the red face, lacking the black and white head pattern of European and western Asian birds. Adults moult after the breeding season, with some individuals beginning in July and others not completing their moult until November. After moult birds appear less colourful, until the tips of the newly grown feathers wear away.

The song is a pleasant silvery twittering.

Distribution and habitat
The European goldfinch is native to Europe, North Africa, and western and central Asia. It is found in open, partially wooded lowlands and is a resident in the milder west of its range, but migrates from colder regions. It will also make local movements, even in the west, to escape bad weather. 
It has been introduced to many areas of the world.
It was introduced to Bermuda, Canada, the United States, Mexico, Peru, Argentina, Chile, the Falkland Islands, Uruguay, Brazil, South Africa, Australia, and New Zealand in the 19th century, and their populations quickly increased and their range expanded greatly. In Australia, they now occur from Brisbane to the Eyre Peninsula, and are also spread throughout New Zealand. In the United States, they have become established in the western Great Lakes region.

Behaviour and ecology

Breeding
The nest is built entirely by the female and is generally completed within a week. The male accompanies the female, but does not contribute. The nest is neat and compact and is generally located several metres above the ground, hidden by leaves in the twigs at the end of a swaying branch. It is constructed of mosses and lichens and lined with plant down such as that from thistles. It is attached to the twigs of the tree with spider silk. A deep cup prevents the loss of eggs in windy weather. Beginning within a couple of days after the completion of the nest, the eggs are laid in early morning at daily intervals. The clutch is typically 4-6 eggs, which are whitish with reddish-brown speckles. They have a smooth surface and are slightly glossy. The eggs are incubated for 11–13 days by the female, who is fed by the male. The chicks are fed by both parents. Initially they receive a mixture of seeds and insects, but as they grow the proportion of insect material decreases. For the first 7–9 days the young are brooded by the female. The nestlings fledge 13–18 days after hatching. The young birds are fed by both parents for a further 7–9 days. The parents typically raise two broods each year and occasionally three.

Feeding
The European goldfinch's preferred food is small seeds such as those from thistles (the Latin name is from Carduus, a genus of thistles), cornflowers, and teasels, but insects are also taken when feeding young. It also regularly visits bird feeders in winter. In the winter, European goldfinches group together to form flocks of up to 40, occasionally more. European goldfinches are attracted to back gardens in Europe and North America by birdfeeders containing  (commercially described as nyjer) seed.  This seed of an annual from Africa is small, and high in oils.  Special polycarbonate feeders with small oval slits at which the European goldfinches feed are sometimes used.

Relationships with humans

European goldfinches are commonly kept and bred in captivity around the world because of their distinctive appearance and pleasant song. If European goldfinches are kept with domestic canaries, they tend to lose their native song and call in favour of their cagemates' songs. This is considered undesirable, as it detracts from the allure of keeping European goldfinches. In Great Britain during the 19th century, many thousands of European goldfinches were trapped each year to be sold as cage birds. One of the earliest campaigns of the Royal Society for the Protection of Birds was directed against this trade. Wildlife conservation attempts to limit bird trapping and the destruction of the open space habitats of European goldfinches.

Steglitz, a borough of the German city of Berlin is named after the European goldfinch. The surname Goldspink is based on the Scots word for the European goldfinch.

Christian symbolism
Because of the thistle seeds it eats, in Christian symbolism the European goldfinch is associated with Christ's Passion and his crown of thorns. The European goldfinch, appearing in pictures of the Madonna and Christ child, represents the foreknowledge Jesus and Mary had of the Crucifixion.  Examples include the Madonna del cardellino or Madonna of the Goldfinch, painted by the Italian Renaissance artist Raphael in about 1505–6, in which John the Baptist offers a European goldfinch to Christ in a warning of his future. In Barocci's Holy Family, a European goldfinch is held in the hand of John the Baptist, who holds it high out of reach of an interested cat. In Cima da Conegliano's Madonna and Child, a European goldfinch flutters in the hand of the Christ child. It is also an emblem of endurance, fruitfulness, and persistence. Because it symbolizes the Passion, the European goldfinch is considered a "saviour" bird and may be pictured with the common housefly (which represents sin and disease). The European goldfinch is also associated with Saint Jerome and appears in some depictions of him.

Depictions in art
Antonio Vivaldi composed a Concerto in D major for Flute "Il Gardellino" (RV 428, Op. 10 No. 3), where the singing of the European goldfinch is imitated by a flute. An anonymous Italian Neapolitan poem titled Il Cardellino was put to music by Saverio Mercadante and sung by Jose Carreras.

European goldfinches, with their "wanton freak" and "yellow flutterings", are among the many natural "luxuries" that delight the speaker of John Keats' poem 'I stood tip-toe upon a little hill...' (1816).

In the poem The Great Hunger by Patrick Kavanagh, the European goldfinch is one of the rare glimpses of beauty in the life of an elderly Irish farmer:

Donna Tartt's novel The Goldfinch won the 2014 Pulitzer Prize for Fiction. A turning point in the plot occurs when the narrator, Theo, sees his mother's favourite painting, Carel Fabritius's The Goldfinch, in the Metropolitan Museum of Art.

References

Sources

Further reading

External links

Audio recordings from Xeno-canto
European Goldfinch videos, photos & sounds on the Internet Bird Collection
Ageing and sexing by Javier Blasco-Zumeta & Gerd-Michael Heinze
Feathers of European Goldfinch (Carduelis carduelis) 
The RSPB: Goldfinch

European goldfinch
Birds of Europe
Birds of North Africa
Birds of Macaronesia
Birds of Western Asia
European goldfinch
European goldfinch